The Red Cross of Chad was founded in 1983. It has its headquarters in N’Djamena, Chad.

In 2018, CRC trainers collaborated with international researchers from LFR International to create a lay first responder program in Am Timan. Investigators trained local motorcycle taxi drivers to provide first aid and transport. Over 12 months, first responders demonstrated a cost-effective prehospital emergency care alternative for rural African settings.

References

External links
Red Cross of Chad Profile

Chad
1983 establishments in Chad
Organizations established in 1983
Medical and health organisations based in Chad